The Cranes Are Flying (translit. Letyat zhuravli) is a 1957 Soviet film about the Second World War. It depicts the cruelty of war and the damage done to the Soviet psyche as a result of war, which was known in the Soviet Union as the Great Patriotic War.

The film was directed at Mosfilm by the Georgian-born Soviet director Mikhail Kalatozov in 1957 and starred Aleksey Batalov and Tatiana Samoilova. Adapted by Viktor Rozov from his play, the film won the Palme d'Or at the 1958 Cannes Film Festival, the only Soviet film to win that award. (In 1946, The Turning Point was one of eleven films awarded the Grand Prix, the predecessor of the Palme d'Or.)

Plot
In Moscow, on June 22, 1941, Veronika and her boyfriend Boris watch cranes fly over the city as the sun rises and then sneak back into their families' apartments. Hours later, Boris’s cousin Mark wakes him with news that the Germans have invaded.

Veronika soon learns that Boris volunteered for the army. Boris asks his grandmother to give Veronika her birthday gift, a stuffed squirrel toy ("squirrel" is Boris's pet name for Veronika) into which he slides a love note. Veronika arrives too late to see Boris at his apartment, but his grandmother gives Veronika the stuffed squirrel. Veronika searches for Boris at the assembly station but misses finding him there too, as he marches off to war.

Veronika remains in Moscow with her parents, who are killed in a German air raid that also destroys their apartment building. Boris's family invites the orphaned Veronika to stay with them.

Boris's cousin Mark tells Veronika he loves her, but she faithfully waits for Boris. Veronika and Mark are alone in the apartment when another air raid occurs. Mark makes a pass at her, but she rebuffs him. Furious at being rejected, he rapes her. Veronika and Mark marry, but she despises him, and is in turn despised by the family who considers she betrayed Boris.

At the front, Boris gets into an argument with another soldier, Volodya, who taunts him over a photo of Veronika. Their commanding officer catches them fighting and assigns them a dangerous reconnaissance mission. Boris saves Volodya’s life, but Boris gets shot. In his final moments, he has a vision of the wedding that he and Veronika never had.

To escape the German offensive, the family is relocated to Siberia. Veronika works as a nurse in a military hospital run by Boris's father, Fyodor. Mark and Veronika are miserable in their marriage.

When a soldier in the hospital becomes hysterical after he received a letter saying his girlfriend left him for someone else, Veronika rushes to get Fyodor, who is processing the arrival of wounded troops. She barely misses seeing the injured Volodya, who is about to be admitted to the hospital, before Fyodor says that the hospital is full. Fyodor admonishes the distraught soldier to forget his unfaithful and unworthy girlfriend. Veronika overhears Fyodor’s speech and becomes upset since she appears to be such a woman.

Overwhelmed with guilt, Veronika tries to throw herself in front of a train. Just before she attempts suicide, she sees a young child about to be hit by a car and rescues him. The boy has been separated from his mother, and his name is Boris. Veronika takes the boy home and looks for her squirrel toy from Boris. Boris's sister Irina spitefully tells Veronika that Mark is giving the toy to his mistress at her birthday party. Veronika races over to the party, where a partygoer has finally found the note that Boris hid. Veronika grabs it, and in voice-over Boris narrates the final tender love note to her.

Fyodor learns that Mark bribed his way out of being drafted into the Red Army. He realises Mark betrayed Russia and the family and has taken advantage of Veronika. Fyodor kicks Mark out, and Veronika is forgiven by the family for "betraying" Boris. The boy saved by Veronika becomes part of the family. Later, Volodya, having recovered, comes in search of Boris's family and tells them that Boris is dead.

In 1945, the war has ended, and Veronika and Volodya stroll by the river back in Moscow. They are very close, but Veronika still refuses to believe that Boris is dead since Volodya was injured himself and never saw Boris die. When Boris’s unit returns, Veronika carries a huge bouquet of flowers, intends to give them to him and hunts for him and his friend Stepan during a celebration at the train station. Veronika finds Stepan and finally learns that Boris is indeed dead. In tears, she stumbles through the celebrating crowd. As Stepan gives a rousing speech, asserting that those who died in the war will never be forgotten, Veronika goes from grieving to handing out her flowers to the returning soldiers and their families. When she looks up, cranes are flying again in the sky over Moscow.

The film ends with the words:
"But we shall not forget those left on the battlefield.
Time will pass.
Towns and villages will be rebuilt.
Our wounds will heal.
But our fierce hatred of war will never diminish. ….
We have triumphed not to destroy.
But to build a new life."

Cast

 Tatiana Samoilova as Veronika
 Aleksey Batalov as Boris
 Vasili Merkuryev as Fyodor Ivanovich
 Aleksandr Shvorin as Mark
 Svetlana Kharitonova as Irina
 Konstantin Nikitin as Volodya
 Valentin Zubkov as Stepan
 Antonina Bogdanova as Grandmother
 Boris Kokovkin as Tyernov
 Yekaterina Kupriyanova as Anna Mikhajlovna

Reception and influence
As the film scholar Josephine Woll observes, the protagonist Veronika was instrumental in shaping the post-Stalinist Soviet movies by heralding more complicated multi-dimensional celluloid heroines and focusing on the impact of war on common people. It was not only Soviet audiences that accepted and sympathised with Veronika's story. The lead actress of Cranes,  Tatiana Samoilova, who was frequently identified with her role, took Europe by storm. Following the film's victory at the Cannes Film Festival in 1958, where it earned the event‘s prestigious Grand Prize, the world celebrated the film's main protagonist, and critics hailed the production for its stunning cinematography, acting, direction and editing. Woll notes that the French Liberation commentator, for example, approvingly contrasted Samoilova's purity and authenticity with that of Brigitte Bardot, a French female icon. Samoilova remembered receiving a watch from her East German fans during a festival there. The gift featured the inscription: "Finally we see on the Soviet screen a face, not a mask".

References

External links
 
 
 
 The Cranes Are Flying an essay by Chris Fujiwara at the Criterion Collection
 Comparison of different DVD editions (in Russian and English)
 

1960 films
1960s war drama films
Soviet war drama films
Soviet black-and-white films
1960s Russian-language films
Eastern Front of World War II films
Films set in Moscow
Films set in the Soviet Union
Films shot in Moscow
Films shot in Moscow Oblast
Palme d'Or winners
Mosfilm films
Films directed by Mikhail Kalatozov
Films set in the 1940s
Soviet romantic drama films
Russian black-and-white films
Russian World War II films
Soviet World War II films